Cyclanthera tenuifolia is a species of flowering plants in the family Cucurbitaceae. It is found in Ecuador.

References

External links

tenuifolia
Plants described in 1877
Flora of Ecuador
Taxa named by Alfred Cogniaux